Juan Micha Obiang Bicogo (born 28 July 1975) is an Equatoguinean football manager and former player who played as a forward. He is the current manager of the Equatorial Guinea national team.

International career
Micha capped for Equatorial Guinea at senior level in late 1990s and early 2000s.

Managerial career
After finishing his playing career, Micha became a manager in Madrid, Spain. While in CF Fuenlabrada, he knew Esteban Becker, whom he convinced to take the Equatorial Guinea women's national team in 2012. He has integrated Becker's coaching staff in both women's and men's national teams.

By 2015, Micha was also the head coach of the Equatorial Guinea national under-17 team. In July 2020, he presented his candidacy to be named in charge of the senior Equatorial Guinea men's national team, after Frenchman Sébastien Migné left the position vacant.

On 23 September 2020, Micha was appointed by the Equatoguinean Football Federation (FEGUIFUT) to coach once again the national under-17 team. On 29 October 2020, as Equatorial Guinea did not have an official head coach for the senior national team at the time, he was summoned by FEGUIFUT President Gustavo Ndong to take the side (along with Casto Nopo) for the two upcoming official matches against Libya in November. As Nzalang Nacional won both games, he was asked by FEGUIFUT to continue in the bench, but he wanted to sign a contract first.

On 23 March 2021, Micha officially signed a one-year contract to be the next head coach of Equatorial Guinea. Two days later, his team defeated Tanzania and qualified to the 2021 Africa Cup of Nations.

References

1975 births
Living people
People from Bata, Equatorial Guinea
Equatoguinean footballers
Association football forwards
Equatorial Guinea international footballers
Equatoguinean football managers
Equatorial Guinea national football team managers
Equatoguinean expatriate sportspeople in Spain
Expatriate football managers in Spain
Women's association football managers